Kuseise is a Palestinian village located seven kilometers west of Hebron. The village is in the Hebron Governorate Southern West Bank. According to the Palestinian Central Bureau of Statistics, the village had a population of 2,276 in mid-year 2006. The primary health care facilities for the village are designated by the Ministry of Health as level 1.

Footnotes

Villages in the West Bank
Hebron Governorate
Municipalities of the State of Palestine